Power Couple is an Indian reality show which aired on Sony Entertainment Television, it was launched on 12 December 2015. The series is produced by Lalit Sharma of Colosceum Media Pvt Ltd. The series is the Indian adaptation of the Israeli television series Power Couple.

The series features 10 popular celebrity couples from across fields, who will compete with each other over various challenges. They will be tested in one roof whether these couples love and trust each other or not. The series is shot in Goa and is hosted by Arbaaz Khan with guest appearances by Malaika Arora Khan The first season of Power Couple India was won by Naved and Sayeeda. Shahwar Ali and Marcella were the runner-up.

Couple Status

See also
 I Can Do That

References

External links
 Power Couple on Sony Entertainment Television
 SonyLIV Site

2015 Indian television series debuts
Indian reality television series
Hindi-language television shows
Sony Entertainment Television original programming